Peperomia vestita is a species of epiphyte from the genus Peperomia. It was discovered by Casimer de Candolle in 1898.

Etymology
Vestita came from the Latin word "vestitus". Vestitus defines as covered or blackened, having been covered by vegetation.

Distribution
Peperomia vestita is endemic to Bolivia.

Bolivia
La Paz
Franz Tamayo
Madidi National Park
Apolo
Inquisivi
Sud Yungas
Nor Yungas
Santa Cruz
Florida
Bermejo
Cochabamba
Ayopaya

Description
It has long petiole leaves with an oblong-pointed base, obtuse tips on both sides, densely haired on both sides, and central nerves sending 4-5 nerves on both sides. Catkins are arranged in a pinnacle at the tip of the stem themselves than shorter and very short-pedunculated leaves, they have circular leaves, a broad leaf ovary at the base, and shortly narrowed at the long-right tip and unequal.

Subtaxa
These subtaxa are accepted.

Peperomia vestita var. lindenii 
Peperomia vestita var. vestita

References

vestita
Flora of Central America
Flora of North America
Flora of Panama
Flora of El Salvador
Flora of Mexico
Plants described in 1898
Taxa named by Casimir de Candolle